Chlordantoin (clodantoin) is an antifungal drug used in gynecology.

References

Further reading

 

Antifungals
Hydantoins
Organochlorides